The San Benito Formation is a Katian geologic formation of central Bolivia. The formation belongs to the Cochabamba Group, overlies the Anzaldo Formation and is overlain by the Cancañiri Formation. Shelly fossils have been found at few horizons and consist mainly of linguliformean brachiopods, bivalves, and a few homalonotid trilobite remains. Poorly preserved graptolites occur occasionally in the shaly beds.

Fossil content 
The formation has provided the following fossils:

 Desmochitina minor
 Rafinesquina pseudoloricata
 Tunariorthis cardocanalis
 Villosacapsula setosapellicula
 Ancyrochitina cf. ancyrea
 Hirnantia cf. transgrediens
 Rhabdochitina cf. magna
 Bistramia sp.
 Ctenodonta sp.
 Lingula sp.

See also 
 List of fossiliferous stratigraphic units in Bolivia

References

Further reading 
 J. L. Benedetto. 2013. Upper Ordovician Brachiopods from the San Benito Formation, Cordillera del Tunari, Bolivia. Ameghiniana 50(4):418-428 
 R. Suárez Soruco. 1976. El sistema ordovícico en Bolivia. Revista Tecnica YPF Bolivia 5(2):111-123

Geologic formations of Bolivia
Ordovician System of South America
Ordovician Bolivia
Katian
Sandstone formations
Shale formations
Siltstone formations
Ordovician southern paleotemperate deposits
Paleontology in Bolivia
Formations